The 1939 Women's Western Open was a golf competition held at Westwood Country Club, which was the 10th edition of the event. Helen Dettweiler won the championship in match play competition by defeating Bea Barrett in the final match, 4 and 3.

Women's Western Open
Golf in Missouri
Women's Western Open
Women's Western Open
Women's Western Open
Women's sports in Missouri